Morarji Ranchhodji Desai (29 February 1896 – 10 April 1995) was an Indian independence activist and politician who served as the 4th Prime Minister of India between 1977 to 1979 leading the government formed by the Janata Party. During his long career in politics, he held many important posts in government such as Chief Minister of Bombay State, Home Minister, Finance Minister and 2nd Deputy Prime Minister of India.

Following the death of Prime Minister Lal Bahadur Shastri, Desai was a strong contender for the position of Prime Minister, only to be defeated by Indira Gandhi in 1966. He was appointed as Minister of Finance and Deputy Prime Minister in Indira Gandhi's cabinet, until 1969. When Indian National Congress split in 1969 he became a part of the INC (O). After the controversial emergency was lifted in 1977, the political parties of the opposition fought together against the Congress (I), under the umbrella of the Janata Party, and won the 1977 election. Desai was elected Prime Minister, and became the first non-Congress Prime Minister of India.

On the international scene, Desai holds international fame for his peace activism and created efforts to initiate peace between two rival South Asian states, Pakistan and India. After India's first nuclear test in 1974, Desai helped restore friendly relations with China and Pakistan, and vowed to avoid armed conflict such as Indo-Pakistani war of 1971. He was honoured with the highest civilian award of Pakistan, the Nishan-e-Pakistan on 19 May 1990.

He is the oldest person to hold the office of prime minister, at the age of 81, in the history of Indian politics. He subsequently retired from all political posts, but continued to campaign for the Janata Party in 1980. He was conferred with India's highest civilian honour, the Bharat Ratna. He died at the age of 99 in 1995.

Early life

Birth
Morarji Desai was born into a Gujarati Anavil Brahmin family. His father's name is Ranchhodji Nagarji Desai and his mother's name is Vajiaben Desai. He was born in Bhadeli village, Bulsar district, Bombay Presidency, British India (present-day Valsad district, Gujarat, India) on 29 February 1896, the eldest of eight children. His father was a school teacher.

School education and early career
Desai underwent his primary schooling in The Kundla School (now called J.V. Modi school), Savarkundla and later joined Bai Ava Bai High School, Valsad. 
. Desai resigned as deputy collector of Godhra in May 1930 after being found guilty of going soft on Hindus during the riots of 1927–28 there.

Freedom fighter
Desai then joined the freedom struggle under Mahatma Gandhi and joined the civil disobedience movement against British rule in India. He spent many years in jail during the freedom struggle and owing to his sharp leadership skills and tough spirit, he became a favourite amongst freedom-fighters and an important leader of the Indian National Congress in the Gujarat region. When provincial elections were held in 1934 and 1937, Desai was elected and served as the Revenue Minister and Home Minister of the Bombay Presidency. He was also the first political leader to support the liberties of sexual minorities.

In government

Chief Minister of Bombay and Partition of two state

Before the independence of India, he became Bombay's Home Minister and was later elected Chief Minister of Bombay state in 1952. It was a period when movements for linguistic states were on the rise, particularly in South India. Bombay was a bi-lingual state, home to Gujarati-speaking and Marathi-speaking people. Since 1956, activist organisation Samyukta Maharashtra Samiti led a movement for a Marathi-speaking state of Maharashtra. Desai was opposed to such movements, including the Mahagujarat Movement led by Indulal Yagnik demanding a new state of Gujarat. Desai proposed that the metropolitan Mumbai be made a Union territory. His logic was that a separate development region would suit the city's cosmopolitan nature, with citizens from diverse settings across various linguistic, cultural, and religious backgrounds living there for generations. The movement led to violence across the city and state, and Desai ordered the police to open fire on the Samyukta Maharashtra Samiti demonstrators who had gathered at Flora Fountain. The protesters were led by Senapati Bapat. In the carnage that followed, 105 protesters, were killed. The issue escalated and is believed to have forced the Central Government to agree to two separate states based on language. After the formation of the present State of Maharashtra, Bombay, now Mumbai became its state capital. Flora Fountain was renamed  "Hutatma Chowk" ("Martyrs' Square" in English) to honour the people killed in the firing. Later Desai moved to Delhi when he was inducted as finance Minister in the cabinet of Prime Minister Jawaharlal Nehru.

Nehru cabinet
Desai was socially conservative, pro-business, and in favour of free enterprise reforms, as opposed to Prime Minister Jawaharlal Nehru's socialistic policies.

Rising in Congress leadership, as a fierce nationalist with anti-corruption leanings, Desai was at odds with Prime Minister Nehru and his allies, and with Nehru's age and health failing, he was considered as a possible contender for the position of Prime Minister.

Congress party leadership contest
In 1964 after prime minister's Nehru's death, Desai was outflanked in the leadership contest by the Nehru's protege, Lal Bahadur Shastri. Desai was invited but did not join the short lived Shastri cabinet.
In early 1966, the unexpected passing away of Prime Minister Lal Bahadur Shastri after only 18 months in power made Desai once again a contender for the top position. However, he was defeated by Nehru's daughter, Indira Gandhi, in the Congress party leadership election by a big margin.

Indira Gandhi cabinet
Desai served as Deputy Prime Minister and Finance Minister of India in the Indira Gandhi government until July 1969 when Prime Minister Gandhi took the finance portfolio from him but asked him to serve as the deputy prime minister. However, to save his self-respect, Desai tendered his resignation from the Gandhi cabinet. Gandhi also nationalized the fourteen largest banks in India at the same time.

In opposition
When the Congress party split in 1969, Desai joined the Indian National Congress (Organisation) faction of the party, whereas Indira Gandhi formed a new faction called Indian National Congress (Requisitionists). Alternatively, the two factions of Desai and Indira were called Syndicate and Indicate respectively. The 1971 general elections to the Indian parliament were won by Indira Gandhi's faction in a landslide. Desai, however, was elected as a member of the Lok Sabha or lower house of Parliament. Desai went on indefinite hunger strike on 12 March 1975 to support Nav Nirman movement of Gujarat.

In 1975, Indira Gandhi was convicted of electoral fraud by the Allahabad High Court, after opponents alleged she had used government civil servants and equipment during the campaign for the 1971 General Elections. During the subsequent Emergency rule in 1975–77, Desai and other opposition leaders were jailed by the Indira Gandhi government as part of a massive crackdown.

Janata wave of 1977
The popular anti-corruption movement led by Jayaprakash Narayan and the Janata-wave in 1977 led to the complete routing of the Congress party in Northern India, and a landslide victory for the opposition Janata alliance in the National elections held in March 1977. Desai was selected by the Janata alliance, later Janata Party as their parliamentary leader, and thus became the first non-Congress Prime Minister of India.

Prime Minister of India (1977-1979)

As a Prime Minister
In January 1977, Indira Gandhi dissolved the Lok Sabha and declared that elections to the body were to be held during March 1977. Opposition leaders were also released and promptly formed the Janata alliance to fight the elections. The alliance registered a landslide victory in the election. On the urging of Jayaprakash Narayan, the Janata alliance selected Desai as their parliamentary leader and thus the Prime Minister.

Foreign policy
Desai restored normal relations with China, for the first time since the 1962 war. He also communicated with the military ruler of Pakistan, General Zia-ul-Haq and established friendly relations. Despite his pacifist leanings, he refused to sign the non-nuclear proliferation treaty despite the threat of stopping supply of uranium for power plants by the USA Congress.

Nuclear programme
Domestically, Desai played a crucial role in the Indian nuclear program after it was targeted by major nuclear powers after India conducted a surprise nuclear test in 1974. Desai kept India's nuclear reactors stating "they will never be used for atomic bombs, and I will see to it if I can help it". Internationally, he reaffirmed India's stand that it would not manufacture nuclear weapons and would refrain from conducting even peaceful nuclear explosions. In 1977, the Carter administration offered to sell heavy water and uranium to India for its nuclear reactors but required American on-site inspection of nuclear materials. Desai declined, seeing the American stance as contradictory, in light of its own nuclear arsenal.

Decimation of R&AW
Desai had described the Research and Analysis Wing (R&AW), India's external intelligence agency, as the praetorian guard of Indira Gandhi and had promised to stop all activities of the R&AW after becoming prime minister. He closed down much of the agency, and reduced its budget and operations, such as closing its Information Division. B. Raman, the former head of the Counter-Terrorism Division of R&AW and noted security analyst, revealed that in an informal discussion, Desai indiscreetly told Pakistan's Chief Martial Law Administrator General Zia ul-Haq that his government was well aware of Pakistan's nuclear development.

Intra-party squabbles and collapse of Janata government
His government undid many amendments made to the constitution during emergency and made it more difficult for any future government to impose a national emergency.  However, the Janata Party coalition was full of personal and policy friction and thus failed to achieve much, owing to continuous in-wrangling and much controversy. With no party in leadership of the coalition, rival groups vied to unseat Desai.  Controversial trials of prominent Congress leaders, including Indira Gandhi over Emergency-era abuses worsened the fortunes of his administration.
In 1979, Raj Narain and Charan Singh pulled out of the Janata Party, forcing Desai to resign from office and retire from politics.  The chief reason for the collapse was the demand by the duo and other left-leaning members, like Madhu Limaye, Krishan Kant, and George Fernandes that no member of the Janata party could simultaneously be a member of an alternative social or political organisation.  This attack on "dual membership" was directed specifically at members of the Janata Party who had been members of the Jan Sangh, and continued to be members of Rashtriya Swayamsevak Sangh, the Jan Sangh's ideological parent.<ref>Lloyd I. Rudolph and Susanne H. Rudolph, In Pursuit of Lakshmi: The Political Economy of the Indian State' (1987), University of Chicago Press, pp 457–459.</ref>

Retirement and death
Desai campaigned for the Janata Party in 1980 General Election as a senior politician but did not contest the election himself. In retirement, he lived in Mumbai. When former French Prime Minister Antoine Pinay died on 13 December 1994, Desai became the world's oldest living former head of government. He was much honoured in his last years as a freedom-fighter of his generation. On his 99th birthday, he was visited by Prime Minister P. V. Narasimha Rao, and soon after began to fall ill. He was treated in a hospital in Mumbai due to low blood pressure and a chest infection. He died on 10 April 1995, aged 99, after he underwent surgery for a blood clot in his brain.

Desai was a moralist. He was a vegetarian "both by birth and by conviction."

Social service
Desai was a Gandhian follower, social worker, institution builder and a great reformer. He was the Chancellor of Gujarat Vidyapith. Even during his term as the Prime Minister he used to visit and stay at Vidyapith during the month of October. He lived simply and used to write post cards himself even when he held the office of Prime Minister. Sardar Patel deputed him to conduct meetings of farmers in Kaira district which finally led to the establishment of the Amul Cooperative movement. During his rule, he withdrew intervention in Public Distribution System and rationing shops were literally lost due to cheap sugar and oil available in the market.

Personal life
Desai married Gujraben in 1911, at the age of 15. Gujraben lived to see her husband becoming Prime Minister. Out of his five children, only three survived infancy. Desai's three surviving children were: his daughters Virumati, Indu and his son Kantilal.

Virumati, who was married to Ramanlal Desai, died in early 2000s. Indu, a medical student died in 1953. Kantilal Desai, who was married to Padma Kirloskar, died in 2014.

Desai has two grandsons, through his son Kantilal; Bharat Desai and Jagdeep Desai, and one granddaughter; Varsha Desai Naik. One of Desai's great-grandsons, Madhukeshwar Desai is currently the National Vice-President of the Bharatiya Janata Yuva Morcha, the youth wing of the BJP. Madhukeshwar is married to Sneha Menon, a celebrity talkshow host. Of Desai's great-grandaughters; Kalayani is a celebrity stylist and designer, Disha is a Harvard-graduate Lawyer and Sanghavi is a social worker and benefactor for several noted charities. Another of Desai's great-grandsons, Vishaal Desai is a writer and filmmaker.

Desai, a longtime practitioner of 'urine therapy', spoke in 1978 to Dan Rather on 60 Minutes about the benefits of drinking urine. He also attributed his longevity to drinking urine.

 In popular culture Morarji, an Indian television series about the life of Desai from his days as an independence activist till his tenure as prime minister, aired on the national public broadcaster Doordarshan's DD National channel. The Films Division of India made For Peace and Friendship, a 1978 short documentary film directed by C. Ramani about Desai's campaign for nuclear disarmament. Govind Namdeo appeared as Desai in the 2019 conspiracy thriller film The Gandhi Murder, by Karim Traïdia and Pankaj Sehgal, which explores a British abetment in the assassination of Mahatma Gandhi.Pradhanmantri'', a 2013 Indian docudrama television series which aired on ABP News and covers the various policies and political tenures of Indian PMs, dedicated the thirteenth episode – "Story of Morarji Desai and Janata Party" – to his term as the country's leader.

Notes

References

External links

 
 

 
1896 births
1995 deaths
India MPs 1957–1962
India MPs 1962–1967
India MPs 1967–1970
India MPs 1971–1977
India MPs 1977–1979
Desai administration
Gujarati people
Janata Party politicians
Prime Ministers of India
Indian Deputy Prime Ministers
Recipients of the Bharat Ratna
Indian Hindus
Indian anti-war activists
Indian anti–nuclear weapons activists
Indian independence activists from Gujarat
Gandhians
People from Valsad district
Indian National Congress politicians from Gujarat
Lok Sabha members from Gujarat
Indians imprisoned during the Emergency (India)
Indian National Congress (Organisation) politicians
Bombay State politicians
Chief ministers from Indian National Congress
Activists from Gujarat
Politicians from Surat
Ministers of Internal Affairs of India
Finance Ministers of India
Ministers for Corporate Affairs
Commerce and Industry Ministers of India
20th-century prime ministers of India